Edwin Robert Herrod (1866–1918), born in Radford, Nottingham, was an English footballer who played as a forward.

As a 15-year-old, he lived in Derby earning his living as a gimp maker.

After moving from Derby St Luke's, he became a top scoring winger for Doncaster Rovers in the Midland Alliance for the 1890–91 season, netting 14 times in all League and cup games. This attracted attention from Leicester Fosse from the Midland League who signed him in September 1891.

After one goal in eight games, he moved to Rotherham Town. He scored in a record 11–0 defeat of Leicester in April 1892, where Leicester were disadvantaged by having to play with only ten men as a player did not turn up. He later played for Derby Town.

Honours
Doncaster Rovers
Midland Alliance League
Runner up: 1890–91
Sheffield and Hallamshire Senior Cup
Champions: 1890–91

References

1866 births
1918 deaths
Footballers from Nottingham
English footballers
Association football forwards
Derby St Luke's F.C. players
Doncaster Rovers F.C. players
Leicester City F.C. players
Rotherham Town F.C. (1878) players
English Football League players